Maregaon is a town in Wani Subdivision of Yavatmal district in the Indian state of Maharashtra.

Maregaon is a small town which is newly declared as Nagar Panchayat in 2015 and the elections were held on 1 November 2015. It has 17 wards. Previously known Dr. Ambedkar square is now bifurcated and the new square christened as Dr. A.P.J. Abdul Kalam Chowk. It is located on Wani yavatmal road nearly 18 km from Wani and is a tehsil place.  Major profession is agriculture. It has black cotton soil which is suitable for Cotton and soybean, both important crops in this tehsil.  There is Tehasil Kacheri, Panchayat Samiti, Civil Court and other Offices and Banks in Maregaon. Also, there is a Cement factory at 4 km on Mardi road, Dam at Nawargaon, Mines (stone and crusher) at Narsala, Limestone mines at Gourala on Wani road.  It has Science, Commerce and Arts degree College. CBSE schools, D.Ed. College, Pharmacy College, Adarsh High School, Mahatma Jyotiba Phule Vidyalaya and Rashtriya Vidyalaya and Junior College. The place is going to be well developed and has two Ginning and Pressing  factories. Vanoja devi temple is located near Mardi and Pandav Devi (Pandhar Devi) temple on Maregaon-Karanji road approximately 11 km. It has regularly Tuesday Bazaar-haat behind Z.P. Primary School. The population of tehsil mostly comprises tribals comprising Gond and Kolam tribes in nearby villages. The tehsil has been bifurcate to form another tehsil "Zari-Jamani". New coal mines has been discovered in recent times in this area and this could help to improve the economy of the area.

Climate
Update soon

Villages in Maregaon Tahsil

sakhara

Population

According to the Census 2011 the total population of Maregaon is 78713.
The following table shows:

References

 Census 2011, Government of Maharashtra
 vlist.in/sub-district/04092.html

Cities and towns in Yavatmal district
Talukas in Maharashtra